"Overkill" is a song by Australian pop rock band Men at Work. It was released in March 1983 as the second single from their second studio album Cargo. Written by lead singer Colin Hay, it peaked at No. 3 on the Billboard Hot 100; No. 5 on the Australian Kent Music Report Singles Chart; and top 10 in Canada, Ireland, and Norway. The song was a departure from the group's style of reggae-influenced pop rock, featuring a melancholic feel musically and lyrically.

Background 
"Overkill" was written by Men at Work frontman Colin Hay, who described the song as being about "stepping into the unknown." He elaborated,

Hay was proud of the song after composing it; he recalled, "That was the first song that I wrote where I thought that maybe I could actually make a living as a songwriter, perhaps. I thought that was a good song that I'd written, one that will stand the test of time. I felt at the time it had something to it. I was very happy with that song."

Release
Men at Work's second studio album, Cargo, was released in Australia in April 1983, reaching No. 1 on the Australian Kent Music Report Albums Chart. The album's lead single, "Dr. Heckyll & Mr. Jive", was issued in Australia ahead of the album in October 1982 and reached No. 6 on the Kent Music Report Singles Chart. Despite recording having been completed in mid-1982, Cargo'''s release was held back due to the international commercial success of the band's 1981 debut album, Business as Usual.

"Overkill" was released in March 1983 and debuted on the Billboard Hot 100 chart at No. 28 on 9 April. It peaked at No. 3 in early June. The album's third single, "High Wire", followed in late 1983, peaking at only No. 89 in Australia, and No. 23 on Billboard's Hot Mainstream Rock Tracks. The band toured the world extensively in 1983 to promote the album and related singles. The song was No. 55 in the year-end Top 100 chart in Canada.Cash Box praised the "supple sax line."

 Music video 
The video was mostly shot in the Melbourne suburb of St Kilda and featured landmarks such as the Esplanade Hotel and the St Kilda Pier.

Track listing
 "Overkill" (Colin Hay) –   3:44
 "Till the Money Runs Out" (Colin Hay, Ron Strykert, Greg Ham, John Rees, Jerry Speiser) – 3:05

 Personnel 
 Colin Hay – lead vocals, guitar
 Greg Ham – saxophone, synthesizers, background vocals
 Ron Strykert – guitar, background vocals
 John Rees – bass, background vocals
 Jerry Speiser – drums, background vocals

 Chart history 
Weekly charts

Year end charts

 Lazlo Bane version

American alternative rock band Lazlo Bane covered the song and originally released it as a b-side of their debut single "Buttercup" on Fish of Death Records.

After signing with Almo Sounds the song was released as promo single and included on the EP Short Style, and it was later released on the band's debut album 11 Transistor, which came out in January 1997.
 As a commercial single "Overkill" was released in some territories in 1997 and 1998.

The song was recorded with participation of Colin Hay, who plays guitar on the track and sings the last verse solely and last chorus together with Chad Fischer.

Lazlo Bane's music video
Lazlo Bane's music video, directed by Mark Miremont and also featuring Hay, was released 28 May 1997 and eventually entered MTV2's Top 10 of the 1997.

The video shows Lazlo Bane playing the song in a large hall of the hotel during the night while disturbing other residents, who were played by the members of the band with Colin Hay playing the front desk clerk. During the first half of the song Hay receives several angry calls about the noise but does nothing about it. During the guitar solo the hotel starts to shake, finally forcing Hay to enter the hall where the band is playing, but only to sing the rest of the song together with the band.

Track listing
1996 Promo CD (Almo Sounds PRO-CD-8027)
"Overkill" (Colin Hay) – 4:14

1997 CD (Festival Records D1648)
"Overkill" (Colin Hay) – 4:14
"Flea Market Girl" (Chad Fischer, Kevin Hunter) – 3:56
"Buttercup" (Fischer, Lyle Workman) – 3:44
"Mean Mr. Mustard" (John Lennon, Paul McCartney) – 2:24

1998 CD (BANG! 20545)
"Overkill" (Colin Hay) – 4:14
"Novakane" (Chad Fischer) – 2:37
"Prada Wallet" (Fischer / Josh Clayton-Felt / Kevin Hunter) – 1:11

Other cover versions
 The Benjamin Gate released a cover of the song on their 2002 album Contact.
 In 2003, Colin Hay's Man @ Work album consisted of re-recordings of songs from the Men at Work catalog as well as his solo career songs. The album featured an acoustic version of "Overkill". An edited version of that track was previously released in September 2002 on Music from Scrubs, the first NBC series Scrubs soundtrack album. Hay also appeared in the series itself, performing an acoustic version of the song in Season's 2 premiere episode, "My Overkill".
 In 2003, Emmerson Nogueira released an acoustic cover of the song on his Versão Acústica 3 album.
 John Farnham covered the song for his 2005 album I Remember When I Was Young, which consist entirely of cover versions of songs by chart-topping Australian artists.
 In 2007, Dashboard Confessional released a version of the song on the cover album The Wire Tapes Vol. 1''.

References 

1982 songs
1983 singles
1997 singles
Men at Work songs
Songs written by Colin Hay
Epic Records singles
Song recordings produced by Chad Fischer
Lazlo Bane songs